Barrie Ciliberti (born July 27, 1936) is an American professor and politician. He is a professor at the University of Maryland University College and current Republican legislator in the Maryland House of Delegates, representing District 4. He previously represented District 39 in the House of Delegates from 1995 to 1999.

Early life and education
Ciliberti was born in Philadelphia, Pennsylvania, where he graduated from Friends Select School. He later attended Ursinus College, where he earned a B.A. degree in history in 1957; Georgetown University, where he earned a M.A. degree in history in 1960; and Catholic University, where he earned a Ph.D. degree in administration in 1975.

Ciliberti is married to his wife, Pam, and has five adult children. Outside of politics, he enjoys mountain climbing and spending time with his children. His family moved from Rockville to Urbana in the early 2000s.

Career
Since 1965, Ciliberti has worked as an associate professor of education at Bowie State University.

In 1985, Ciliberti was appointed by President Ronald Reagan to a member of the National Graduate Fellows Program Fellowship Board for a six-year term. President Reagan also appointed Dr Ciliberti to serve as a member of the National Advisory Council on Adult Education. He has served as a guest lecturer for the U.S. Information Agency and a special assistant for ethnic affairs with the Republican National Committee.

In 1994, Ciliberti was elected to the Maryland House of Delegates in District 39, riding the Gingrich wave to victory. He lost re-election to a second term in 1998, losing to Democrats Charles Barkley, Paul Carlson, and Joan F. Stern.

Ciliberti unsuccessfully ran for Congress in 1996, losing to incumbent U.S. Representative Connie Morella in the Republican primary election.

Dr. Ciliberti has served two civilian tours in Iraq working with the United States Department of State.  On his first term, he worked with the United States Embassy in Baghdad on election security in advance of the historic elections in Iraq on January 30, 2005. Dr. Ciliberti's second tour was 255 miles north of Baghdad in the city of Mosul, Iraq where he served as the Senior Governance Advisor for Ninewah Province where he helped build the governance capacity of Provincial and city leaders throughout Ninewah Province.

In 2014, Ciliberti unsuccessfully ran for the Maryland House of Delegates in District 4, receiving 14.0 percent of the vote in the Republican primary.

In January 2015, the Frederick County Republican Central Committee recommended Ciliberti to replace Kelly Schulz in the Maryland House of Delegates after she was appointed to serve in Governor-elect Larry Hogan's cabinet as the Secretary of Labor. The Carroll County Republican Central Committee also voted to recommend Ciliberti, in addition to Jason Miller and Ken Timmerman, to fill the vacancy. Hogan appointed Ciliberti to the House of Delegates on February 3, 2015.

In the legislature
Ciliberti was sworn into the Maryland House of Delegates to represent District 39 on January 11, 1995. During his legislative career in the Maryland General Assembly, he became known for his opposition to mandatory volunteerism and his stance against aggressive driving.

Ciliberti was again sworn into the Maryland House of Delegates to represent District 4 on February 4, 2015 after paying campaign finance infractions for missing campaign finance reports.

Ciliberti was an early and enthusiastic supporter of Donald Trump, even when many in the Maryland Republican Party were keeping their distance. In 2016, Ciliberti ran for National Delegate to the Republican National Convention, pledged to Trump. He won the Republican primary with 15.4 percent of the vote. He ran again as an Alternate Delegate pledged to Trump in 2020, receiving 32.8 percent of the vote in the Republican primary.

Committee assignments
 Member, Environment and Transportation Committee, 2019–present (housing & real property subcommittee, 2019–present; land use & ethics subcommittee, 2019–present)
 Special Joint Committee on Pensions, 2017–2018
 Appropriations Committee, 2015–2018 (education & economic development subcommittee, 2015–2018; oversight committee on pensions, 2015–2018)
 Member, Environmental Matters Committee, 1995–1999 (environmental & natural resources subcommittee)
 Member, Joint Committee to Study Mandates on Local Government, 1995–1997

Other memberships
 Member, Maryland Veterans Caucus, 2016–present
 Member, Maryland Military Installation Legislative Caucus, 2017–present

Political positions

Abortion
During the 2015 legislative session, Ciliberti introduced legislation that would prohibit abortions past 20 weeks, excluding specific medical emergencies. The bill was re-introduced during the 2016 legislative session.

In September 2015, Ciliberti and state Senator Michael Hough wrote a letter to David Brinkley, the Maryland Secretary of Budget and Management, to push the state to eliminate funding for Planned Parenthood from the state's budget.

Ciliberti supports the overturning of Roe v. Wade, saying that the issue of abortion should be left to the states.

Business
In July 2015, the Maryland Business for Responsible Government gave Ciliberti a score of 86 percent in its annual legislative scorecard.

COVID-19 pandemic
Ciliberti introduced legislation in the 2020 legislative session that would charge people who attack doctors or nurses with a sentence of up to 10 years in prison, a $5,000 fine, or both.

In April 2020, Ciliberti questioned the legality of the mask mandates implemented by an executive order issued by Governor Hogan, calling the mandates "draconian".

Education
In April 2019, Ciliberti voted against the Blueprint for Maryland's Future. He was the only member of the Frederick County delegation to do so.

Environment
In July 2015, the Maryland Business for Responsible Government gave Ciliberti a score of 50 percent in its annual legislative scorecard.

In April 2021, Ciliberti joined Democrats in the House Environment and Transportation Committee in voting in favor of the Climate Solutions Now Act of 2021.

Guns
In March 2018, Ciliberti voted against a bill that would ban bump stocks, which passed the Maryland House of Delegates by a vote of 128-7. He was the only member of the Frederick County delegation to vote against the bill.

National politics
In December 2019, Ciliberti called the first impeachment of Donald Trump an "attempted coup d'etat".

Election results

References

External links
 House of Delegates profile page

1936 births
Living people
Georgetown University Graduate School of Arts and Sciences alumni
Catholic University of America alumni
Republican Party members of the Maryland House of Delegates
Politicians from Philadelphia
Ursinus College alumni
21st-century American politicians
Friends Select School alumni